Cottunculus is a genus of marine ray-finned fish belonging to the family Psychrolutidae. These fishes are found in the Atlantic, Pacific and Arctic oceans.

Species
There are currently 6 recognized species in this genus:
 Cottunculus granulosus Karrer, 1968 (Fathead)
 Cottunculus microps Collett, 1875 (Polar sculpin)
 Cottunculus nudus J. S. Nelson, 1989 (Bonyskull toadfish)
 Cottunculus sadko Essipov, 1937
 Cottunculus spinosus Gilchrist, 1906
 Cottunculus thomsonii (Günther, 1882) (Pallid sculpin)
 Cottunculus tubulosus Byrkjedal & Orlov, 2007

References

Psychrolutidae
 
Taxa named by Robert Collett
Marine fish genera